Afraciura is a genus of tephritid  or fruit flies in the family Tephritidae.

Species
Afraciura reculta (Munro, 1947)
Afraciura quaternaria (Bezzi, 1924)
Afraciura quinaria (Bezzi, 1924)
Afraciura zernyi Hering, 1941

References

Tephritinae
Tephritidae genera
Diptera of Africa